Thomas "Tommy" Vercetti is a fictional character and the playable protagonist of the 2002 video game Grand Theft Auto: Vice City, the fourth main installment in Rockstar Games' Grand Theft Auto series. The first protagonist in the series with full dialogue, Tommy was voiced by Ray Liotta.

Portrayed as a temperamental gangster and criminal mastermind, the character is an ex-made man of the Forelli crime family, a fictional Italian Mafia organisation in the Grand Theft Auto universe. After serving a fifteen-year prison sentence for murder, Tommy is released in 1986 and resumes work for the Forelli family, but finds himself caught in an ambushed drug deal and subsequently tasked with recovering the stolen money and drugs. Tommy's quest leads him to make various criminal contacts that he works for, slowly building up a reputation within the criminal underworld of Vice City, a fictional town based on Miami, Florida. After murdering the drug lord who masterminded the ambush, he takes over his criminal empire, which he subsequently expands with the help of his contacts, ultimately becoming the kingpin of Vice City.

Tommy was well-received by critics, who found him to be more fleshed-out and likeable than previous protagonists in the series, and praised his characterization, comparing it to that of Tony Montana from the 1983 film Scarface. Liotta's performance as Tommy was also praised, and earned him multiple year-end accolades.

Design 

Tommy, an Italian-American, is portrayed with a swarthy, handsome appearance, combed dark brown, almost black hair, and a constant five o'clock shadow. He first appears wearing a light blue-green Hawaiian shirt with dark blue palm trees printed on it, a gold pearl necklace around his neck, a gold watch around his left wrist, and a pair of blue jeans and white sneakers. This outfit becomes known as Tommy's "street" clothes. As the game progresses, Tommy is offered more wardrobe options: he obtains a blue-purple pastel suit with the sleeves rolled up over a black dress shirt and black loafers, as well as the option of a dark pinstripe suit labeled as "Mr. Vercetti" (which bears similarities to Tony Montana's suit). A light green jumpsuit is available to perform a bank robbery, complete with a hockey mask, and is even able to wear the uniform for an allied gang, among many others.

Tommy Vercetti, in several ways, exhibits characteristics of fictional drug lord Tony Montana from the 1983 film Scarface. This coincides with the heavy themes and appearance of the movie that has been implemented into Vice City. Among these characteristics, his exile from his old home (Liberty City), his rise to power (acquiring property and wealth in the city, and a mansion which also sports an interior similar to that of Montana's mansion). Tommy is also a hired assassin, has killed his own collaborators (Lance Vance), taken over his temporary boss's business (Ricardo Diaz) and rebelled against his former leader (Sonny Forelli), as Tony Montana had. The only notable difference is that the final gunfight in Montana's mansion sees Montana eventually killed, whereas the final gunfight in Tommy's mansion sees Tommy managing to single-handedly take down his captors and survive.

Characteristics 
Tommy Vercetti is depicted as both intelligent and temperamental; he is easily angered and quick to resort to violence. He has no hesitation about killing, though many of his victims are in turn trying to kill Tommy as well, or have done something that requires them to be killed. Despite all this, Tommy does also show a softer side as seen with his relations with Mercedes Cortez, the daughter of Juan Garcia Cortez, and Earnest Kelly, an elderly employee at the Print Works printing company that he buys later in the game; the former serves as a love interest for Tommy, while the latter is more of a father figure due to his childhood memories of working with his father at a printworks.

Biography

Early life 
Tommy Vercetti was born in Liberty City to an Italian-American family. As a child, he would often visit his father at his job as a printing press operator, and helped him by cleaning the rollers. Although Tommy initially dreamed of an honest life, he quickly became caught up in the criminal lifestyle as a teenager, after befriending Sonny Forelli. Sonny, a prominent member (presumably already Don) of the Forelli Crime Family, got Tommy involved in various criminal activities, and eventually inducted him into the family as a made man.

In 1971, jealous and nervous of Tommy's rising reputation within the Mafia, Sonny sent him into a trap to be killed, under the guise of a mission to assassinate a rival mobster in the city's Harwood district. When he arrived, Tommy was swiftly ambushed by eleven men, but managed to kill them all. Despite acting in self-defense, Tommy was arrested and sent to prison for multiple charges of murder. At one point, he was to be placed on death row, but due to the Forelli familly's influence and possible interference, he only served fifteen years. While in prison, Tommy earned the nickname "The Harwood Butcher" for his actions prior to his arrest.

Release from prison 
Fresh out of prison in 1986, Tommy is immediately dispatched by Sonny to Vice City to oversee an important drug deal. The deal was arranged by Sonny to both keep Tommy outside Liberty City in order to avoid further conflict with law enforcement, and to allow the Forelli family (by this time the most powerful Mafia organization in Liberty City) to expand into the drug trade in the south. Once in Vice City, Tommy and his assigned bodyguards meet the Forellis' crooked lawyer Ken Rosenberg, who drives them to the deal's location. When the deal is ambushed by masked assailants who kill Tommy's bodyguards and one of the customers, Tommy is forced to flee with Ken and abandon the money given to him by Sonny and the merchandise. After calling Sonny to give him the bad news, Tommy finds himself tasked with retrieving the drugs and Sonny's money, and kill whoever masterminded the ambush, under the threat of retaliation from Sonny.

During his investigation, Tommy makes a number of allies who offer him help, including retired Colonel Juan Garcia Cortez, who helped set up the exchange; music producer Kent Paul, a friend of Ken's who maintains connections with Vice City's criminal underbelly; Lance Vance, the vengeful brother of the customer killed in the ambush; and Texan real estate developer Avery Carrington, who hires Tommy to assist him with several jobs. Through Cortez, Tommy meets drug lord Ricardo Diaz, who employs him and Lance, but is later revealed to be responsible for the ambush. After working for Diaz to earn his trust, the pair kill him in his mansion, getting back their money and drugs.

Business ventures 
With Diaz dead, Tommy takes over his empire, and slowly distances himself from the Forelli family, ignoring Sonny's orders to pay him the money he is owed. While he remains in contact with most of his allies, he begins to neglect Lance, who asks him to be treated like an equal partner on multiple occasions. Instead, Tommy becomes more focused on expanding his criminal syndicate, called the "Vercetti Gang", by forcing various businesses to pay him protection money, buying out nearly bankrupt companies to be used as fronts for illicit operations, and forming alliances with gangs such as the Los Cabrones and the Vice City Bikers.

After Tommy establishes himself as the undisputed kingpin of Vice City, he is forced to defend his businesses from Forelli mobsters sent by Sonny, who decided to take actions against Tommy. After learning Sonny will be coming to Vice City to collect what he believes he is owed, Tommy plans to pay him tribute with counterfeit money. However, when Sonny arrives at Tommy's mansion, he reveals that he knows about his plan thanks to Lance, who betrayed him, and admits his role in Tommy's arrest fifteen years prior. A shootout then ensues in the mansion, during which Tommy prevents the Forellis from stealing his money and murders Lance for his betrayal, before finally killing Sonny in a tense standoff. Moments later, Ken arrives to a scene of carnage, but Tommy assures him that everything is fine, because without Sonny, he is in charge now. He then names Ken his new right-hand man, declaring the moment to be "the beginning of a beautiful business relationship."

Later life 
Not much is known about Tommy's life after 1986 other than his partnership with Ken being short-lived. At some point before 1992, when Ken's cocaine addiction became a serious nuisance for Tommy, he sent him to a rehabilitation center in Fort Carson, San Andreas, and abandoned him there. In The Introduction, a short prologue film to Grand Theft Auto: San Andreas, Ken gets out of rehab after completing his treatment and tries to contact Tommy, but is unsuccessful, as the latter has cut all ties with him.

Influences and analysis 

Prior to the release of Vice City, IGN stated that Tommy was likely to "leave the same kind of imprint on kids today that [actor Ray Liotta's] portrayal of Ray Sinclair left on every high school and college kid who saw Something Wild back in 1986." They also compared Liotta's portrayal of Tommy to his portrayal of Henry Hill in Goodfellas.

When asked about his portrayal of Tommy, Liotta stated that "it was hard work." He said that "you're pretty much putting yourself in [the game developers'] hands and doing whatever they want so there's not much for you to do creatively."

Reception 
The character of Tommy Vercetti received very positive reviews and remarks from critics and players of Vice City, making it to many lists of the best video game characters. IGN said that they "were ready for a more fleshed-out protagonist" after Grand Theft Auto IIIs Claude. Crave Online stated that playing as Tommy was "a breath of fresh air". The Age praised Ray Liotta's voice acting and stated "while the character riffs on Tony Montana throughout the game, Liotta's speeches give him a reckless sense of humour that makes him more likeable". GameDaily praised Liotta's portrayal as having transformed him from a generic-looking thug to a "tough guy who ruled the 80's." The Telegraph described Tommy as "the most amoral" Grand Theft Auto protagonist. Liotta won the award for Best Live Action/Voice Male Performance at the 2003 G-Phoria Awards and Best Performance by a Human at the 2003 Spike Video Game Awards.

A popular fan-propagated rumour alleged that Steve, the Minecraft player character, is based on Tommy Vercetti due to the alleged physical resemblance between both characters. The theory relied on a 2009 Tumblr post by Minecraft creator Markus Persson which documented his progress working on the game, where he acknowledged that visual designs inspired by Grand Theft Auto video games were used as a foundation for his work. In 2020, Persson posted on social media and denied any tangible connections between both characters.

References 

Fictional assassins in video games
Fictional businesspeople in video games
Fictional criminals in video games
Fictional American people in video games
Fictional aviators
Fictional characters from New York (state)
Fictional characters from Florida
Fictional crime bosses
Fictional drug dealers
Fictional mass murderers
Fictional money launderers
Fictional gangsters
Fictional Italian American people
Grand Theft Auto: Vice City
Grand Theft Auto characters
Male characters in video games
Video game characters introduced in 2002
Video game mascots
Video game protagonists